Matthew or Matt Ross may refer to:

Matthew Ross (minister) (born 1967), minister of the Church of Scotland
Matt Ross (actor) (born 1970), American actor, director and screenwriter
Matthew Ross, List of The 4400 characters
Matthew Ross, film director, of Fellowship of the Dice and other films
Matthew Ross (filmmaker) (born 1976), writer-director of Frank & Lola